Camaroptera is a genus of small passerine birds in the family Cisticolidae that are found in sub-Saharan Africa.

The genus was erected by the Swedish zoologist Carl Jakob Sundevall in 1850. The type species is the green-backed camaroptera (Camaroptera brachyura). The word Camaroptera comes from the Ancient Greek kamara for "arch" and pteron for "wing".
 
The genus contains the following five species:
 Green-backed camaroptera (Camaroptera brachyura)
 Grey-backed camaroptera (Camaroptera brevicaudata)
 Hartert's camaroptera (Camaroptera harterti) 
 Yellow-browed camaroptera (Camaroptera superciliaris)
 Olive-green camaroptera (Camaroptera chloronota)

Molecular phylogenetic studies have shown that the green-backed and the grey-backed camaroptera are closely related, and some taxonomists treat them as conspecific.

References

Ryan, Peter (2006). Family Cisticolidae (Cisticolas and allies). pp. 378–492 in del Hoyo J., Elliott A. & Christie D.A. (2006) Handbook of the Birds of the World. Volume 11. Old World Flycatchers to Old World Warblers'' Lynx Edicions, Barcelona 

 
Cisticolidae
 
Bird genera
Taxonomy articles created by Polbot